Viktor Aleksandrovich Guz (born 16 January 1971) is a Russian professional football coach and a former player.

Club career
He made 5 appearances over two seasons in the Soviet Top League for FC Rotor Volgograd.

He played 6 seasons in the Russian Football National League for FC Torpedo Volzhsky and FC Volgar-Gazprom Astrakhan.

References

1971 births
People from Prokhladny, Kabardino-Balkar Republic
Living people
Soviet footballers
Russian footballers
Association football goalkeepers
FC Energiya Volzhsky players
FC Rotor Volgograd players
FC Volgar Astrakhan players
FC Orenburg players
FC Ordabasy players
FC Aktobe players
FC Zhetysu players
Soviet Top League players
Kazakhstan Premier League players
Russian expatriate footballers
Expatriate footballers in Kazakhstan
Russian expatriate sportspeople in Kazakhstan
Russian football managers
FC Zhemchuzhina Sochi managers
Sportspeople from Kabardino-Balkaria